Jean Kalala N'Tumba (7 January 1949 – 11 January 2021) was a Congolese football forward who played for Zaire in the 1974 FIFA World Cup. He also played for AS Vita Club.

References

External links
FIFA profile
HFSH profile

1949 births
2021 deaths
Democratic Republic of the Congo footballers
Democratic Republic of the Congo international footballers
Association football forwards
AS Vita Club players
1974 FIFA World Cup players
1972 African Cup of Nations players
21st-century Democratic Republic of the Congo people